Elaphrus fuliginosus is a species of ground beetle in the subfamily Elaphrinae. It was described by Say in 1830.

References

Elaphrinae
Beetles described in 1830